Äynu is a Turkic cryptolect spoken in Western China. Some linguists call it a mixed language, having a mostly Turkic grammar, essentially Uyghur, but a mainly Iranian vocabulary. Other linguists argue that it does not meet the technical requirements of a mixed language. It is spoken by the Äynu, a nomadic people, who use it to keep their communications secret from outsiders.

Name 
The language is known by many different spellings, including Abdal, Aini, Ainu, Ayni, Aynu, Eyni and Eynu. The Abdal (ئابدال) spelling is commonly used in Uyghur sources. Russian sources use Eynu, Aynu, Abdal (Эйну, Айну, Абдал) and Chinese uses the spelling Ainu. The Äynu people call their language Äynú (ئەينۇ).

Geographic distribution
Äynu is spoken in Western China among Alevi Muslims in Xinjiang on the edge of the Taklimakan Desert in the Tarim Basin.

Similarly mixed varieties of Turkic and Persian are spoken in other locations including Turkey and Uzbekistan. The speakers of these varieties are also referred to as "Abdal".

Use as a secret language
The only speakers of Äynu are adult men, who are found to speak it outside of their area of settlement in order to communicate without being understood by others. Uyghur is spoken with outsiders who do not speak Äynu and at home when it is not necessary to disguise one's speech.

Vocabulary
Most of basic vocabulary in Aynu comes from the Iranian languages, which might be speculated that the language have been originally an Iranian language and have been turned into a Turkic language after a long period. There are three vocabulary formation methods in Ainu language: simple words, derived words and compound words. The affixes of derived words have both Uyghur and Persian origin. Old people mostly use Persian affixes, while the young people use Uyghur derived vocabulary and affixes.

Phonology

// is a palatal consonant. Phonemes on the left of a cell are voiceless, while those on the right are voiced.

Orthography
Due to Äynu's secretive nature, along with a lack of official status in areas which it is spoken in, it does not have any widely used writing system. However, the Uyghur Arabic alphabet is typically used in the occasion where it needs to be written.

Numerals
Äynu numerals are completely Persian. However, ordinal adjectives are made by adding Uyghur -(I)ncI suffix.

Numbers

Ordinal adjectives

Notes

References

External links
 Numerals in Äynu 

Agglutinative languages
Languages of China
Language contact
Cant languages
Turkic languages
Mixed languages